Abbeyville is an unincorporated town located in Gunnison County, Colorado, United States.

History
Abbeyville was mining camp nearby the Gold Cup Mine, which was discovered around 1880. The camp grew around a smelter which was built on the site in 1881. A post office was established at Abbeyville in 1882, and remained in operation until 1884. By 1887, S.S. Sutton was the only inhabitant of Abbeyville.

Geography
Abbeyville is located at  (38.4614,-106.2924).

Climate

According to the Köppen Climate Classification system, Abbeyville has a subarctic climate, abbreviated "Dfc" on climate maps. The closest weather station is at the nearby Taylor Park Reservoir, which is where the climate data comes from.

References 

Populated places in Gunnison County, Colorado

br:Abbeyville